The Ministry of Public Works and Housing (Spanish: Ministerio del Poder Popular para las Obras Públicas y Vivienda, MOPVI) was a ministry of the Venezuelan government until June 2010.

The creation of the Ministry of Infrastructure was proposed in 1999. The ministry was formed from the merger of the Ministry of Transport and Communications and the Ministry of Urban Development. It was established as per the Official Gazette of the Bolivarian Republic of Venezuela No. 36,775 of August 30, 1999, and amended by Gazette No. 36,850 of December 14, 1999. It was later amended by Decree No. 3,125 in the Gazette No. 38,024 of September 16, 2004. At that point, the Ministry of Housing and Habitat was created and the Infrastructure ministry lost responsibility for housing. In June 2010 the Venezuelan government divided the agency into two new agencies, the Ministerio del Poder Popular para Transporte y Comunicaciones and the Ministerio del Poder Popular para Vivienda y Hábitat.

The Ministry was known as the Ministerio del Poder Popular para la Infraestructura (Ministry of Popular Power for Infrastructure) from January 2007 to March 2009, and was previously the Ministerio para la Infraestructura (Ministry for Infrastructure, Minfra).

Ministers

Subordinate agencies
Subordinate agencies included:
 Conviasa
 Junta Investigadora de Accidentes de Aviación Civil
 Junta de Investigación de Accidentes Aéreos

References

External links

 Ministry of Public Works and Housing  (Archive)

Public Works and Housing
Venezuela, Public Works and Housing